"Beautiful Waste" is a single released by Australian rock group, The Triffids in February 1984. It was not included on any of the band's studio albums nor extended plays, it was first compiled on Australian Melodrama (1994). The B-side, "Property Is Condemned", was included on the 1984 EP Raining Pleasure. A film clip was made for "Beautiful Waste". Its name was adapted for a 2008 posthumous compilation of mid-1980s non-album tracks, Beautiful Waste and Other Songs.

In May 2008 Youth Group performed a cover version of "Beautiful Waste" on national radio station Triple J's "Like a Version" segment. Youth Group's Toby Martin had previously filled in as one of the guest vocalists for a reformed The Triffids, at the Sydney Festival performances earlier in that year.

Track listing
All tracks written by David McComb.

 "Beautiful Waste" – 3:20
 "Property Is Condemned" – 2:54

Personnel

The Triffids
 David McComb – lead vocals, guitar, piano, miscellaneous
 Alsy MacDonald – drums, vocals, percussion
 Robert McComb – violin, guitar, keyboards, vocals
 Martyn P. Casey – bass, vocals
 Jill Birt – organ

Additional musicians
 Ian Macourt – cello
 David Angell – viola

References

1984 singles
The Triffids songs
Songs written by David McComb
1984 songs
Mushroom Records singles